John H. Weeks (March 15, 1845 – March 10, 1911) was an American soldier during the American Civil War who was awarded the Medal of Honor. The medal was awarded on 1 December, 1864 for actions as a private in the 152nd New York Infantry at the Battle of Spotsylvania Court House, Virginia on 12 May, 1864. He was born in Hampton, Connecticut and is now interred in Hartwick Seminary Cemetery, New York.

Medal of Honor Citation 
Capture of flag and color bearer using an empty cocked rifle while outnumbered 5 or 6.

References 

1845 births
1911 deaths
American Civil War recipients of the Medal of Honor
People from Hampton, Connecticut